Abergwili is an electoral ward, representing the communities of Abergwili and Llanllawddog, Carmarthenshire, Wales.

Profile
In 2014, the Abergwili electoral ward had an electorate of 1,906. The total population was 2,335, of whom 71.6% were born in Wales. 55.7% of the population were able to speak Welsh.

Current Representation
The Abergwili Ward is a single-member ward for the purposes of Carmarthenshire County Council elections. Since 2017 it has been represented by Plaid Cymru councillor Dorian Williams.

Carmarthenshire County Council
The first election to the new unitary Carmarthenshire County Council took place in 1995. Pam Palmer, who had represented the ward on the former Carmarthen District Council was elected with a large majority over the Plaid Cymru candidate.

 

In 1999, Palmer was returned unopposed.

Palmer faced opposition from Plaid Cymru and the Labour Party in 2004 but comfortably retained the seat.

In 2008, faced only by a Plaid Cymru opponent, Palmer increased her vote significantly.

At the 2012 election, Palmer was faced by an experienced Plaid Cymru candidate who had fought the Neath by-election in 1991. She was again returned but with a much-reduced majority.

History

County Council Elections
Abergwili first became an electoral ward in the late nineteenth century with the formation of Carmarthenshire County Council and elected a member to that authority until its abolition in 1974.

With the formation of Dyfed County Council, Abergwili was part of the Carmarthen Rural No.6 Ward. This ward was renamed Abergwili in 1989. This ward was considerably larger than the previous Abergwili ward and included Cynwyl Elfed, Bronwydd and Abernant.

When the current Carmarthenshire County Council was formed in 1995 a ward based on similar boundaries to those in existence between 1889 and 1974 was re-established.

District Council Elections
From 1973 until 1996, Abergwili formed an electoral ward for the purposes of elections to Carmarthen District Council.

External links

References

Carmarthenshire electoral wards